Puerto Rico Highway 26 (PR-26), called the Román Baldorioty de Castro Expressway, is the main highway to the Luis Muñoz Marín International Airport and is connected to PR-66. It was converted to a freeway to minimize the traffic in PR-3 and PR-17, to grant better access to the Airport. Several exits exist to provide access to PR-187 (the main route to the Piñones area), PR-37 (Isla Verde) and PR-22 (José de Diego).

Exit list

See also

 Interstate Highways in Puerto Rico
 List of highways numbered 26

Notes

References

External links
 
 Hawaii Highways – Puerto Rico Interstate Photographs (2002)

026
26